Catfield railway station was a station in Catfield, Norfolk. It closed in 1959.

References

Disused railway stations in Norfolk
Former Midland and Great Northern Joint Railway stations
Railway stations in Great Britain opened in 1880
Railway stations in Great Britain closed in 1959